Grappenhall and Thelwall is a civil parish within the Borough of Warrington and the ceremonial county of Cheshire in England.  It has a population of 9,377.

The civil parish was formed in largely its present state in 1936, when the then Thelwall civil parish was joined in its entirety to the ancient civil parish of Grappenhall.

See also

Listed buildings in Grappenhall and Thelwall

References

Sources
 Youngs, F. A. (1991). Guide to the administrative units of England. Volume II: Northern England.  London: Royal Historical Society. .

External links

The Flickr Grappenhall Photography Group
WDCC, Warrington District Camera Club, which is based in Grappenhall

Warrington
Civil parishes in Warrington